This is the list of confirmed tornadoes from the tornado outbreak of May 10–13, 2010 that occurred over the Midwestern and southern United States.

Confirmed tornadoes

May 10 event

May 11 event

May 12 event

May 13 event

See also
Tornadoes of 2010
Tornado outbreak of May 10–13, 2010

Notes

References

05-10
Tornadoes